Djellal  is a town and commune in Khenchela Province, Algeria. According to the 1998 census it had a population of 3,637.

References

Communes of Khenchela Province
Khenchela Province